Alan Travis Williams (born January 28, 1993) is an American professional basketball player for the Nagoya Diamond Dolphins of the Japanese B.League. He is also contracted with the South East Melbourne Phoenix of the National Basketball League (NBL). He played college basketball for UC Santa Barbara before beginning his professional career with the Qingdao DoubleStar Eagles of the Chinese Basketball Association in 2015.

High school career
Williams attended North High School. After playing in just one game as a freshman and averaging just 3.5 points as a sophomore, Williams averaged 12.5 points, 10.9 rebounds and 3.3 blocks per game as a junior in 2009–10. As a senior in 2010–11, he averaged 22.1 points, 16.2 rebounds, 4.5 blocks, 2.0 steals, and 1.5 assists, leading North to a Metro Region championship and to the Class 5A quarterfinals. He was named Arizona State Player of the Year that season.

College career
Williams played four seasons of college basketball for UC Santa Barbara between 2011 and 2015, finishing his career as the Gauchos' all-time leader in rebounds and second all-time leading scorer. As a junior in 2013–14, he was named the Big West Conference Player of the Year. He also earned first-team All-Big West honors as a sophomore, junior and senior, and led the NCAA in rebounding as a junior and senior. In 112 games (101 starts) over his four-year career, Williams averaged 15.5 points, 10.0 rebounds, 1.0 assists, 1.0 steals and 1.9 blocks in 27.0 minutes per game.

Professional career

2015 NBA Summer League
After going undrafted in the 2015 NBA draft, Williams played for the Charlotte Hornets (three games in Orlando) and Houston Rockets (four games in Las Vegas) during the 2015 NBA Summer League. For his play with the Rockets in Las Vegas, he earned All-NBA Summer League Second Team honors.

Qingdao DoubleStar Eagles (2015–2016)
On July 25, 2015, Williams signed a one-year deal with the Qingdao DoubleStar Eagles of the Chinese Basketball Association. He appeared in 35 of the team's 38 games during the 2015–16 season, as the Eagles missed a playoff berth with a 16–22 win–loss record. Over those 35 games, he averaged 20.8 points, a league-leading 15.4 rebounds, 2.1 assists, 1.3 steals and 1.6 blocks per game.

Phoenix Suns (2016–2018)

On March 8, 2016, Williams signed a 10-day contract with the Phoenix Suns. He made his NBA debut on March 17 during a 103–69 loss to the Utah Jazz, recording one point and one steal in two minutes. The following day, he signed a multi-year deal with the Suns. On April 9, he recorded a then season-high seven rebounds in a 121–100 win over the New Orleans Pelicans. In the Suns' season finale on April 13, Williams recorded his first double-double in the NBA with season highs of 14 points and 12 rebounds (alongside 3 blocks) in a 114–105 win over the Los Angeles Clippers.

With the Suns' Summer League team in 2016, Williams was the only player to average a double-double throughout the event, averaging 11.8 points and a league-leading 11.2 rebounds over six games, which earned him All-NBA Summer League First Team honors. On September 1, 2016, his contract for the 2016–17 season was fully guaranteed by the Suns. On November 18, 2016, he had a season-best game with 15 points and 15 rebounds in a 116–96 win over the Indiana Pacers. On December 14, he was assigned to the Northern Arizona Suns of the NBA Development League. He was recalled the next day. On February 10, 2017, he had 14 points and 11 rebounds to go with a season-high four blocks in a 115–97 win over the Chicago Bulls. With Tyson Chandler sustaining an injury early in the game and Alex Len missing the game with a suspension, Williams made the most of his 24 minutes on the court. On February 24, 2017, he scored a then season-high 16 points on 8-of-9 shooting in 15 minutes off the bench in a 128–121 overtime loss to the Chicago Bulls. Two days later, he scored a career-high 17 points and tied his career high with 15 rebounds in a 100–96 loss to the Milwaukee Bucks, becoming just the 10th NBA player with multiple 15/15 games in his first 35 career games in the past 19 seasons. On March 5, Williams had 11 points and matched his career best with 15 rebounds in a 109–106 win over the Boston Celtics. On March 9, he had 16 points and 10 rebounds for his fifth straight double-double off the bench in a 122–110 loss to the Los Angeles Lakers. He became the first player in Suns history with five straight double-doubles off the bench. On April 5, 2017, he scored 16 and grabbed a career-best 17 rebounds in a 120–111 loss to the Golden State Warriors.

On July 26, 2017, Williams re-signed with the Suns to a multi-year contract. On September 25, 2017, he was ruled out for six months after undergoing a meniscus repair of his right knee. On March 15, 2018, he was assigned to the Northern Arizona Suns. He was recalled on March 16, reassigned on March 20, and recalled again on March 25. On March 26, he made his season debut for Phoenix against the Boston Celtics. In 16 minutes off the bench, he recorded three points and five rebounds in a 102–94 loss.

On July 2, 2018, Williams was waived by the Suns.

Brooklyn/Long Island Nets (2018–2019)
On September 24, 2018, Williams signed a two-way contract with the Brooklyn Nets. Under the terms of the deal, he split his time between Brooklyn and their NBA G League affiliate, the Long Island Nets. He was waived by Brooklyn on January 2, 2019, but was then re-signed to another two-way contract on January 11. He made his NBA debut that night and remained with the team for the rest of the 2018–19 season.

Shaanxi Xinda (2019)
In July and August 2019, Williams played with Shaanxi Xinda of the Chinese NBL.

Lokomotiv Kuban (2019–2022)
On August 13, 2019, Williams signed with Lokomotiv Kuban of the VTB United League for the 2019–20 season.

On June 4, 2020, Williams re-signed with Lokomotiv Kuban for the 2020–21 season. In November 2020, he was ruled out for the rest of the season with a knee injury.

Williams returned to Lokomotiv Kuban for the 2021–22 season, but left the team in March 2022.

South East Melbourne Phoenix and Nagoya Diamond Dolphins (2022–present)
On August 5, 2022, Williams signed with the South East Melbourne Phoenix in Australia for the 2022–23 NBL season. He led the league in rebounding with 9.6 per game. Following the NBL season, he joined the Nagoya Diamond Dolphins of the Japanese B.League.

He is set to return to the Phoenix for the 2023–24 NBL season.

NBA career statistics

Regular season

|-
| style="text-align:left;"| 
| style="text-align:left;"| Phoenix
| 10 || 0 || 6.8 || .417 || .000 || .643 || 3.8 || .5 || .4 || .5 || 2.9
|-
| style="text-align:left;"| 
| style="text-align:left;"| Phoenix
| 47 || 0 || 15.1 || .517 || .000 || .625 || 6.2 || .5 || .6 || .7 || 7.4
|-
| style="text-align:left;"| 
| style="text-align:left;"| Phoenix
| 5 || 0 || 14.0 || .389 || .000 || .667 || 4.4 || 1.6 || 1.0 || .2 || 4.0
|-
| style="text-align:left;"| 
| style="text-align:left;"| Brooklyn
| 5 || 0 || 5.2 || .615 || .000 || .500 || 3.8 || .6 || .2 || .0 || 3.6
|- class="sortbottom"
| style="text-align:center;" colspan="2"| Career
| 67 || 0 || 13.0 || .506 || .000 || .626 || 5.5 || .6 || .6 || .6 || 6.2

Eurocup

|-
| style="text-align:left;"|2019–20
| style="text-align:left;" rowspan="2"|Lokomotiv
| 10 || 3 || 22.0 || .493 || .0 || .718 || 9.4 || 1.9 || .7 || .3 || 9.4 || 15.8
|-
| style="text-align:left;"|2020–21
| 8 || 8 || 27.2 || .495 || .0 || .619 || 12.5 || 2.1 || 1.0 || 0.9 || 14.5 || 21.1

Personal life
Williams' father, Cody Sr., is a Justice of the Peace for Maricopa County, while his mother, Jeri, is the Chief of Police in Phoenix. His younger brother, Cody Jr., also attended the University of California, Santa Barbara.

References

External links

UC Santa Barbara Gauchos bio

1993 births
Living people
21st-century African-American sportspeople
African-American basketball players
American expatriate basketball people in Australia
American expatriate basketball people in China
American expatriate basketball people in Japan
American expatriate basketball people in Russia
American men's basketball players
Basketball players from Phoenix, Arizona
Brooklyn Nets players
Centers (basketball)
Long Island Nets players
North High School (Phoenix, Arizona) alumni
Northern Arizona Suns players
PBC Lokomotiv-Kuban players
Phoenix Suns players
Power forwards (basketball)
Qingdao Eagles players
South East Melbourne Phoenix players
UC Santa Barbara Gauchos men's basketball players
Undrafted National Basketball Association players